Amando Samo (16 August 1948 – 7 August 2021) was a Catholic bishop.

Samo was born on Moch Island, in the state of Chuuk, Federated States of Micronesia. Ordained to the priesthood in 1977, in 1987 he was named titular bishop of Liberta and auxiliary bishop of the Roman Catholic Diocese of Caroline Islands, Micronesia. 

From 1994 to 1995, he served as coadjutor bishop of the diocese. From 1995 to 2020, Samo was bishop of the diocese.

References

1948 births
2021 deaths
People from Chuuk State
Roman Catholic bishops in Oceania
Roman Catholic bishops of Caroline Islands
20th-century Roman Catholic bishops in Oceania
21st-century Roman Catholic bishops in Oceania
Roman Catholic titular bishops